Stephen Stirling (born 5 January 1990) is a Scottish footballer who plays for [Neilston Juniors]

Stirling started his career with Rangers, spending a loan spell at Stirling Albion, before being released and dropping out the senior game for a short time, then returning with Stranraer. He has also had two spells at Greenock Morton.

Club career
Born in Paisley, Stirling joined Stirling Albion in the 2011 January transfer window until the end of the season. On 7 May 2011 he scored his first league goals, when he scored twice as Stirling ended a 25-match winless streak with victory over Morton on the final day of the season.

After leaving Rangers in 2011, Stirling dropped out of the senior game for a short time playing amateur football in Paisley, before returning to senior football with Stranraer. After scoring 12 goals in 26 league matches, Stirling signed a pre-contract agreement with First Division side Greenock Morton. Stirling scored his first league goal for Morton when he drove in the only goal in a 1–0 victory over Raith Rovers. Stirling missed the rest of the 2012–13 season injured with a broken leg sustained in a league match against Partick Thistle. With him being out of contract in the summer of 2013, Stirling was given the summer to prove he had recovered from his injury by Allan Moore.

After recovering from his leg break, Stirling was given a short-term deal in September 2013. In January 2014, he was released from his contract and returned to his former club Stranraer in January 2014. After eighteen months with the Scottish League One side, Stirling was released from his contract with the side. Shortly after leaving Stranraer, Stirling signed for fellow League One side Stenhousemuir on a one-year contract.

International career
Stirling has represented Scotland at Under-19 international level, playing in the 2009 UEFA U19 European Championship Elite Round.

In total he received nine caps at U19 level, scoring five goals.

Career statistics

A.  The "Other" column constitutes appearances (including substitutes) and goals in the Scottish Challenge Cup.

See also
Greenock Morton F.C. season 2012-13 | 2013–14

References

External links

1990 births
Living people
Scottish footballers
Footballers from Paisley, Renfrewshire
Association football midfielders
Rangers F.C. players
Stirling Albion F.C. players
Scottish Football League players
Scotland youth international footballers
Stranraer F.C. players
Greenock Morton F.C. players
Stenhousemuir F.C. players
Scottish Professional Football League players